Anatole France is a station on Paris Métro Line 3. It is located in the commune of Levallois-Perret, northwest of the capital.

Location
The station is located under Rue Anatole-France in Levallois-Perret at the intersection with Rue Voltaire.

History
It was opened on 24 September 1937 when the line was extended from Porte de Champerret to Pont de Levallois–Bécon.

The station is on the Rue Anatole France, which is named after the author Anatole France, winner of the Nobel Prize in Literature in 1921.

In 2018, 3,734,650 passengers entered this station, which placed it at 140th position of the metro stations for its usage.

Since June 2017, the station has benefited from a renovation aimed at alleviating leakage problems and was completed by 31 December 2018.

Passenger services

Access
The station has two entrances and an escalator, located on Place du Général-Leclerc.

Station layout

Platforms
Anatole France is a standard configuration station. It has two platforms, 105 meters long, separated by the metro tracks, and the vault is elliptical. However, it has a particularity: the platforms are partially offset (like Saint-Germain-des-Prés) due to the narrow width of the street under which it is located. The Commerce and Liège stations have platforms that are completely offset for the same reason. The decoration is of the style used for most metro stations. The lighting canopies are white and rounded in the Gaudin style of the renouveau du métro of the 2000s, and the bevelled white ceramic tiles cover the walls, the vault, and the tunnel exits. The advertising frames are faience in a honey colour and the name of the station is also of faience. It is equipped with benches.

Bus connections
The station is served by lines 174 and 274 of the RATP Bus Network and at night, by lines N16 and N52 of the Noctilien network.

Nearby
 Mairie de Levallois-Perret
 Parc de la Planchette, open to the public in 1924
 Temple de la Petite Étoile

Gallery

References

Roland, Gérard (2003). Stations de métro. D’Abbesses à Wagram. Éditions Bonneton.

Paris Métro stations in Levallois-Perret
Railway stations in France opened in 1937